Greensand, or green sand, is a sand or sandstone which has a greenish color.

Greensand or green sand may also refer to:

Places

England
 Greensand Ridge, an escarpment
 Greensand Ridge Walk, a long-distance path
 Greensand Way, a long-distance path

United States
 Greensand, New Jersey, an unincorporated community
 Green Sand Beach or Papakolea Beach, Hawaii

Other uses
 Green sand (casting), slightly damp sand, used in sand casting of metals
 Olivine sand, which can form green sand beaches
 Project Greensand aims to store captured  on the ocean floor of Denmark's North Sea region

See also
 Lower Greensand Group, a geological unit in southeast England